Efraín Cordero (born 8 March 1938, date of death unknown) is a Salvadoran middle-distance runner. He competed in the men's 3000 metres steeplechase at the 1968 Summer Olympics.

References

1938 births
Living people
Athletes (track and field) at the 1968 Summer Olympics
Salvadoran male middle-distance runners
Salvadoran male steeplechase runners
Olympic athletes of El Salvador
Place of birth missing (living people)